This is a list of Estonian television related events from 1975.

Events

Debuts

Television shows

Ending this year

Births
2 May - Taavi Teplenkov, actor
22 May - Harriet Toompere, actress 
9 July - Jüri Nael, dancer, actor, and TV host
17 December - Hilje Murel, actress

Deaths